The Hamilton Szabos were a junior ice hockey team in the Ontario Hockey Association for one season in  1946-1947, and were previously called the Hamilton Whizzers. The team was based in Hamilton, Ontario, playing home games at the Barton Street Arena, also known as the Hamilton Forum. The Szabos finished ninth place, and second last in the league. The following year the team was disbanded. Three Alumni from the Whizzers/Szabos graduated to play in the National Hockey League.

NHL Alumni
Bob DeCourcy, Val Delory, Al Dewsbury

Yearly Results

External links
 Hamilton Forum - The OHL Arena & Travel Guide

Defunct Ontario Hockey League teams
Ice hockey teams in Hamilton, Ontario
1946 establishments in Ontario
1947 disestablishments in Ontario
Ice hockey clubs established in 1946
Sports clubs disestablished in 1947